Trimble is an unincorporated community in Highland County, Virginia, United States. The community is situated along the Dry Branch, a tributary of the Jackson River, near a gap in Little Mountain through which the Dry Branch flows.

References

Unincorporated communities in Highland County, Virginia
Unincorporated communities in Virginia